Starla is a 2019 Philippine drama television series starring Joel Torre, Jana Agoncillo, Enzo Pelojero, Judy Ann Santos, Meryll Soriano, Joem Bascon, and Raymart Santiago. The series premiered on ABS-CBN's Primetime Bida evening block and worldwide via The Filipino Channel from October 7, 2019 to January 10, 2020, replacing The General's Daughter.

Series overview

Episodes

Season 1

References

Lists of Philippine drama television series episodes
Lists of children's television series episodes
2010s television-related lists
2020s television-related lists